Imogene is a ghost town in Perkins County, in the U.S. state of South Dakota.

History
A post office was established at Imogene in 1910, and remained in operation until 1943. The community has the name of Imogene Wheelock, an early postmaster's daughter.

References

Unincorporated communities in Perkins County, South Dakota
Unincorporated communities in South Dakota